Encounters in the Twilight (Swedish: Moten i skymningen) is a 1957 Swedish drama film directed by Alf Kjellin and starring Eva Dahlbeck, Åke Grönberg and Ann-Marie Gyllenspetz. It was shot at the Råsunda Studios in Stockholm. The film's sets were designed by the art director Gittan Gustafsson.

Cast
 Eva Dahlbeck as Irma Sköld
 Åke Grönberg as 	Roffe Sköld
 Ann-Marie Gyllenspetz as 	Barbro
 Birger Malmsten as 	Olle Lindberg
 Inga Landgré as 	Alice Wiegel
 Erik Strandmark as Victor Strömgren
 Doris Svedlund as Elsa Jonsson
 Sven-Eric Gamble as 	Henry Jonsson
 Sigge Fürst as 	Guest at the Party
 Linnéa Hillberg as 	Mrs. Wiegel 
 Helge Hagerman as 	Lund, Olle's Friend
 Carl-Axel Elfving as 	Svensson, Olle's Friend
 Ingrid Tobiasson as 	Karin, Victor's and Alice's Daughter
 Karl Brännlund as 	Guest at the Party 
 Signe Lundberg-Settergren as 	Irma's and Barbro's Mother 
 Curt Löwgren as 	Disturbed Neighbor 
 Wilma Malmlöf as 	Guest at the Party 
 Hanny Schedin as 	Irma's and Barbro's Aunt 
 Henrik Schildt as 	Maitre d' 
 Georg Skarstedt as Guest at the Party
 Kari Sylwan as Guest at the Party

References

Bibliography 
 Qvist, Per Olov & von Bagh, Peter. Guide to the Cinema of Sweden and Finland. Greenwood Publishing Group, 2000.

External links 
 

1957 films
Swedish drama films
1957 drama films
1950s Swedish-language films
Films directed by Alf Kjellin
Films set in Stockholm
1950s Swedish films